Khurin (also Romanized as Khūrīn, Khorīn, and Khowrīn) is a village in Behnampazuki-ye Jonubi Rural District of the Central District of Varamin County, Tehran province, Iran. At the 2006 National Census, its population was 4,456 in 1,088 households. The following census in 2011 counted 29,447 people in 1,482 households. The latest census in 2016 showed a population of 7,223 people in 1,301 households; it was the largest village in its rural district.

References 

Varamin County

Populated places in Tehran Province

Populated places in Varamin County